The 2015 Men's EuroHockey Indoor Club Champions Cup was the 26th edition of the Men's EuroHockey Indoor Club Champions Cup, Europe's premier men's club indoor hockey tournament organized by the European Hockey Federation. It was held at the Innogy Sporthalle in Mülheim, Germany from 13 to 15 February 2015.

The hosts Uhlenhorst Mülheim won its first title by defeating Arminen 5–4 in the final, Complutense took the bronze medal and Dinamo Stroitel and Namur were relegated to the Trophy division.

Teams

Results

Preliminary round

Pool A

Pool B

Fifth to eighth place classification

Pool C
The points obtained in the preliminary round against the other team are taken over.

First to fourth place classification

Semi-finals

Third place game

Final

Statistics

Final standings

Top goalscorers

See also
2014–15 Euro Hockey League

References

Men's EuroHockey Indoor Club Cup
Club Cup
International indoor hockey competitions hosted by Germany
EuroHockey Indoor Club Cup
Sport in Mülheim